A Season in Sinji is the second novel by J. L. Carr, published in 1967. The novel is set mostly at fictional RAF Sinji in west Africa during the Second World War and features a bizarre cricket match.

Like all of Carr's novels it contains a strong element of personal experience: Carr spent time as an intelligence officer in the Royal Air Force during the war stationed at RAF Bathurst in the Gambia in west Africa, and he was a keen cricketer.  In an interview with Vogue magazine in 1986, Carr described this novel as his "best one" and "a novel written with passion". The publishers paid an advance of £125.  The novel is now published by The Quince Tree Press, which was established by Carr in 1966 to publish his illustrated maps and small books.

Publication history
 1967 Alan Ross Limited
 1976 Quartet Books 
 1985 Penguin Books 
 2003 Quince Tree Press

References 

1967 British novels
English novels
Novels by J. L. Carr
Novels about cricket
Novels set in the Gambia
Novels set during World War II